Edmund Francis Hughes (born 3 October 1968) is a British Conservative Party politician who served in the Second Johnson ministry as Parliamentary Under-Secretary of State for Housing and Rough Sleeping from 2021 to 2022. He has also been the Member of Parliament (MP) for Walsall North since 2017.

He was appointed Parliamentary Under-Secretary of State for Housing and Rough Sleeping in January 2021, due to the resignation of Kelly Tolhurst.

Early life and career
Hughes was born on 3 October 1968 in Birmingham, England. His father was a bus driver and his mother was a cleaner. He has five brothers and attended Handsworth Grammar School (now King Edward VI Handsworth Grammar School for Boys). Hughes studied civil engineering at the University of Glamorgan. 

He was a director of YMCA Birmingham for development and asset management from 2014 to 2017, and assistant chief executive in 2017. He was a trustee of the Walsall Wood Allotment Charity, which helps people in financial need. Hughes served on the West Midlands Police Authority and was chairman of Walsall Housing Group from 2016 until June 2018. 

He stood for the Pheasey ward on Walsall Council in 1998, but was unsuccessful. He was, however, elected as a councillor for the Hatherton Rushall ward on Walsall Council in 1999, gaining the seat from Labour, until 2004 when boundary changes occurred and he was elected a councillor for Streetly ward. He has held several positions on the council including the decision-making cabinet, chairman of Children's Services Scrutiny and Audit committees. He left the council in 2018. He stood unsuccessfully for MP of Birmingham Hall Green in 2005.

Parliamentary career

Hughes was elected the MP for Walsall North at the 2017 general election, where he unseated the sitting veteran Labour Party MP David Winnick. Winnick, aged 83 at the time, had held the seat for the previous 38 years, since the 1979 general election.

Hughes introduced a Ten Minute Rule bill into the House of Commons to improve tenant safety around carbon monoxide poisoning. It received a first reading on 13 September 2017.

Hughes spoke in the Commons during a debate on NHS pay in September 2017, stating that the starting salary for a newly qualified nurse was higher than that of the average constituent of Walsall North, in defending not lifting a below inflation cap of 1% on public-sector pay increases. He said it was his job to stick up for everyone, not just people in the public sector. Despite his intervention, the opposition motion to lift the cap was passed. The Conservative Government subsequently announced, in March 2018, that they would end the cap on NHS salaries.

Hughes has campaigned for more front line police on the streets and raised the issue with Theresa May in the House of Commons.

He is a supporter of Brexit, campaigning for a leave vote, and was one of 62 Conservative MPs who wrote to the Prime Minister urging support for her Lancaster House speech.

Since being elected in June 2017 Hughes had campaigned for funding for a new A&E department at Walsall Manor Hospital, including raising the issue with the Prime Minister at PMQs.  Funding of £36m was eventually allocated by the Department for Health & Social Care in December 2018.

Hughes was a member of the Consolidation Bills Committee and the Women & Equalities Select Committee.

Hughes was made a Parliamentary Private Secretary to the ministerial team of the Ministry of Housing, Communities and Local Government in June 2018. During his time as PPS at MHLG Hughes was responsible for liaising with parliamentary colleagues in respect of revisions to the National Planning Policy Framework which was subsequently published in July 2018. He subsequently moved with Dominic Raab to the Department for Exiting the European Union. He resigned to vote against the Withdrawal Agreement on 15 January 2019. From February 2020 to January 2021, he was an Assistant Whip. 

As chair of the APPG for Excellence in the Built Environment Hughes chaired the committee's inquiry into the need for a New Homes Ombudsman which was published in June 2018. In October 2018 the government announced that there will be a New Homes Ombudsman – "a watchdog that will champion homebuyers, protect their interests and hold developers to account."

He joined the government in January 2021, being appointed as the Parliamentary Under-Secretary of State for Housing and Rough Sleeping at the Ministry of Housing, Communities and Local Government due to the resignation of Kelly Tolhurst.

Hughes endorsed Kemi Badenoch during the July 2022 Conservative Party leadership election. He spoke at her campaign launch event held on 12 July.

Other political work 
Hughes works with libertarian Conservative think tank Freer UK, with whom he released a report on blockchain technologies, advocating that the UK government appoint a Chief Blockchain Officer.

Personal life
He married Clare in 2014. Hughes has a son and daughter from a previous marriage. His brother Des is a Labour councillor.

Hughes is an Aston Villa FC fan and a Catholic.

References

External links

1968 births
Living people
People educated at Handsworth Grammar School
Alumni of the University of Glamorgan
Conservative Party (UK) MPs for English constituencies
UK MPs 2017–2019
UK MPs 2019–present
People from Birmingham, West Midlands
Conservative Party (UK) councillors
Councillors in the West Midlands (county)
People from Walsall